Eric Li Ka-Cheung  (born 23 May 1953) is an adjunct professor at the School of Accountancy of the Chinese University of Hong Kong and the School of Business of Hong Kong Baptist University. He was formerly a member of the Hong Kong Legislative Council for the accounting functional constituency and Chairman of its Public Accounts Committee.

Education
Li is an alumnus of St. Paul's Co-educational College and the University of Manchester. He now serves as a member of the Global Leadership Board of the University of Manchester.

Director
Li is a director of the following listed companies:
Bank of Communications
China Resources
Hang Seng Bank
Sinofert
Sun Hung Kai Properties
SmarTone
Transport International
Wong's International Holdings

Honours
His honorary awards include: Honorary Doctor of Laws from the University of Manchester, Honorary Doctor of Social Sciences from the Hong Kong Baptist University, Honorary Fellow of the Chinese University of Hong Kong and the Hong Kong Polytechnic University, "Beta Gamma Sigma Chapter Honoree" of the Hong Kong University of Science and Technology, Honorary Alumnus of the London Business School.

References

Officers of the Order of the British Empire
Alumni of St. Paul's College, Hong Kong
Living people
Recipients of the Gold Bauhinia Star
1953 births
Members of the Provisional Legislative Council
District councillors of Eastern District
HK LegCo Members 1991–1995
HK LegCo Members 1995–1997
HK LegCo Members 1998–2000
HK LegCo Members 2000–2004
Hong Kong accountants
Members of the Preparatory Committee for the Hong Kong Special Administrative Region
Members of the Selection Committee of Hong Kong
Members of the Election Committee of Hong Kong, 1998–2000
Members of the Election Committee of Hong Kong, 2000–2005
Members of the Election Committee of Hong Kong, 2007–2012
Members of the Election Committee of Hong Kong, 2012–2017
Members of the Election Committee of Hong Kong, 2021–2026
Alumni of St. Paul's Co-educational College
China Resources people